Allactoneura is a genus of flies belonging to the family Mycetophilidae.

The species of this genus are found in Europe, Southeastern Asia and Southern Africa.

Species:
 Allactoneura akasakana Sasakawa, 2005 
 Allactoneura argentosquamosa (Enderlein, 1910)

References

Mycetophilidae